Kamalpur is a saptakoshi 9 municipality  in Saptari District in the Sagarmatha Zone of south-eastern Nepal. At the time of the 2011 Nepal census it had a population of 5,334 people living in 1,038 individual households.

References

Populated places in Saptari District
VDCs in Saptari District